The Society of Cartographers (SoC) was an association of cartographers based in the United Kingdom.  The Society was founded in 1964 at the University of Glasgow and was originally named the Society of University Cartographers. In 1989 the Society adopted a new title and constitution opening up membership to anyone who regularly makes maps.

The Society of Cartographers purported aim was to support and encourage all those actively involved in the production of maps – whatever the method and format of map production. It sought to do this by providing information and opportunities to contact, meet and exchange views and techniques, they hoped to support and encourage those involved in all aspects of mapmaking and maintain a high standard of cartographic illustration and quality, meaningful map production.

The Society's membership was widely drawn from the education sector, statutory institutions, local authorities, public utilities and the commercial and publishing industry. The majority of the membership was UK based, but with a significant world-wide membership.

The SoC was focused on the continual evolution of the mapping industry and how that related to overlapping disciplines (such as GIS; Graphic Design, Web mapping); how maps manifested themselves in today’s society and what that meant to the mapmakers of the day.

Networking
The Society held its annual conference the 'Annual Summer School' in August or September.

The Society published a newsletter and an annual journal, the Bulletin of the Society of Cartographers. As well as awarding a prestigious "Wallis Award" for excellence in Cartography by a member

Legal
The Society of Cartographers (SoC) was a charity registered in England and Wales (No 326285), operating via a not-for-profit company limited by guarantee (No 05940023)

The Society members voted unanimously in 2019 to cease the Society, all members, assets and good will was transferred the their sister society 'The British Cartographic Society" in January 2020

See also
 Royal Geographical Society
 International Cartographic Association
 British Cartographic Society

External links

Geographic societies
Cartography organizations